Haman Stadium is a multi-use stadium in Haman, South Korea. It is currently used mostly for football matches. The stadium has a capacity for 15,000 spectators. 

Football venues in South Korea
Sports venues in South Gyeongsang Province
Sports venues completed in 1999
1999 establishments in South Korea
20th-century architecture in South Korea